Asare Manor is a manor house built in 1749 in the Aknīste region, former Asare municipality, Jēkabpils district, Latvia. The house was built in 1749, rebuilt in the 19th century in Neo-Gothic style, and burned down in 1926.  During the Latvian agrarian reforms in 1920, the manor house was nationalized and lands partitioned.  Prior to reform manor belonged to the Walther-Wittenheim family. Currently only impressive ruins remain.

See also
List of palaces and manor houses in Latvia

References

External links
 

Manor houses in Latvia